The Edicola Palanti inside the Cimitero Monumentale di Milano, work by architect Mario Palanti built in 1924–28, become Civico Mausoleo to honorable citizens of Milan in on 4 February 1981. Famous graves inside are: Hermann Einstein, Walter Chiari, Giovanni D'Anzi, Virgilio Ferrari, Emilio Guicciardi, Paolo Grassi, Franco Russoli, Alfredo Bracchi, Maria Bonizzi, Girolamo Palazzina, Innocenzo Gasparini, Ciro Fontana, Fernanda Wittgens, Franco Parenti, Angelo Cucchi, Carlo Mariano Colombo, Luigi Berlusconi.

Gallery

Notes

External links 
 Civico Mausoleo Palanti
 Piantina: pos.35
 Edicola
 Access - Sei Odiato Perché Temuto Ritemprati

Related links
 Mario Palanti

Mausoleums in Italy
 
Buildings and structures completed in 1928